Islom Kobilov (born 1 July 1997 http://fcbunyodkor.com/players/4 ) is an Uzbekistani footballer who currently plays for Bunyodkor.

Career

Club
On 26 July 2017, FC Bunyodkor announced that Kobilov had returned from a loan deal with Metallurg Bekabad.

Career statistics

Club

International

Statistics accurate as of match played 19 May 2018

Honours

International
Uzbekistan U-23
 AFC U-23 Championship (1): 2018

References

External links 
 

Uzbekistani footballers
1997 births
Living people
FC Bunyodkor players
Place of birth missing (living people)
Association football defenders
Uzbekistan Super League players
Uzbekistan international footballers